
Ortolan may refer to:

Animals

Ortolan bunting (Emberiza hortulana), a bird in the bunting family Emberizidae considered a delicacy in France.

Cuisine
L'Ortolan, a gourmet restaurant in the village of Shinfield, Berkshire, England.

People
Joseph Louis Elzéar Ortolan (1802–1873), a French jurist
Marcel Augusto Ortolan (born 1981), a Brazilian footballer

U.S. Navy ships
, a Lapwing-class minesweeper in the United States Navy
 earned four battle stars during World War II
, a twin-hulled submarine rescue ship

Other uses
Ortolan, an alien race in Star Wars

See also
Ortolani (disambiguation)